Amir Ahmed Mustafa was the chief of staff of Bangladesh Navy from 15 August 1990 to 4 June 1991.

References

See also

|-

Bangladeshi Navy admirals
Chiefs of Naval Staff (Bangladesh)
Pakistan Navy officers